Eliza was a merchant ship built at Prince Edward Island, Canada in 1824. She made one voyage transporting convicts from Hobart Town to Sydney, and two to the Swan River Colony. She was last listed in 1843.

Career
Eliza entered Lloyd's Register (LR) for 1826 with J. Fuze, master, T. Sturge, owner, and trade Cork.

The Register of Shipping (RS) for 1828 showed Eliza with S. Furse, master, Sturge, owner, and trade London–New South Wales.

Under the command of J. Fuze, from Portsmouth, England Eliza stopped at Hobart Town and picked up a number of prisoners for transportation. She arrived in Sydney on 16 May 1828. Eliza departed Port Jackson on 21 June 1828 bound for Batavia.

Eliza made two voyages to the Swan River Colony in Western Australia, probably both under the command of Captain James Weddell. She arrived at Freemantle on 8 May 1830. From there she proceeded to Tasmania. In September 1830 Eliza, Weddell, master, left England and arrived at Freemantle on 3 March  1831 with 43 passengers. Lloyd's List reported on 22 November 1831 that Eliza had grounded at Swan River but had been gotten off and was proceeding to Freemantle. Weddell sailed back to England in 1832.

Citations

1824 ships
Ships built in Canada
Convict ships to New South Wales
Age of Sail merchant ships
Merchant ships of the United Kingdom